La Baronia de Rialb is a municipality in the comarca (county) of the Noguera in Catalonia, Spain. The territory is crossed by the river Rialb and the river Segre. The capital city is Gualter; before it had been La Torre de Rialb.

The municipality is formed by the union of old and tiny hamlets and parishes, which in total accounts for twenty-three Romanesque churches, which is the largest number of such churches in Catalonia.

Demography

Government

List of mayors of La Baronia de Rialb

Economy 
The agricultural sector is still what draws the most numbers of jobs in La Baronia. A country with blueprints irrigated, highly arable lands, with a level of approximately 400 m to over 800 m altitude of usable land is suitable for a wide variety of crops. However, since a few years ago, the tourism sector is becoming the economic boost that the valley needed. In fact, there are currently available a two dozen agritourist establishments.

Main sights

Nature and sport 
 Rialb reservoir –  the biggest dam in Catalonia.
 Forat de Bulí – a unique ravine in the river Rialb. It is suitable for extreme sports like canyoning.
 Alzinera de Cal Penjat – a hundred-year-old oak in El Puig de Rialb.
 GR 1 – a long-distance footpath that crosses the north of La Baronia.
 Pallerols-Andorra Way – a route suitable for hiking that starts in La Baronia and finishes in Andorra.

Architecture 
 Santa Maria de Gualter – a former Benedictine monastery in Gualter.
 Santa Maria de Palau de Rialb – a Romanesque church built between the 11th and 13th centuries.
 Dolmen of Sols de Riu – a megalithic tomb located near the Rialb reservoir, in La Torre de Rialb.

References

External links 

  Official website
 Information - Consorci del Montsec
 Information - Tourism Lleida
 Government data pages 

Municipalities in Noguera (comarca)
Populated places in Noguera (comarca)